Eric Grimbeek (26 September 1908 – 4 February 1995) was a South African sprinter. He competed in the men's 100 metres at the 1936 Summer Olympics.

References

1908 births
1995 deaths
Athletes (track and field) at the 1936 Summer Olympics
South African male sprinters
Olympic athletes of South Africa
People from Polokwane
Sportspeople from Limpopo